Sviadnov is a municipality and village in the Frýdek-Místek District in the Moravian-Silesian Region of the Czech Republic. It has about 2,200 inhabitants.

History
The first written mention of Sviadnov is from 1267.

References

External links

Villages in Frýdek-Místek District